The discography of Nick Cave and the Bad Seeds, a rock band with multi-national personnel, consists of seventeen studio albums, four live albums, four compilation albums, thirty-six singles, five video albums and thirty-eight music videos.

Albums

Studio albums

Live albums

Compilation albums

EPs

Singles

Other appearances

Studio

Live

Music videos

Selected list of video and DVD releases
 The Road to God Knows Where – US tour documentary film
 Live at the Paradiso – Live in Amsterdam, Netherlands
 Nick Cave and the Bad Seeds: The Videos
 God Is in the House – Live in Lyon, France
 The Abattoir Blues Tour – 2DVD/CD, Live at the Brixton Academy, Hammersmith Apollo, etc.
 20,000 Days on Earth – 2014 documentary
 One More Time with Feeling – 2016 documentary

References

External links
 Album reissues on Nick Cave and the Bad Seeds' website

Discography
Discographies of Australian artists
Rock music group discographies